Clyde & Co LLP v Bates van Winkelhof [2014] UKSC 32 is a UK labour law case, concerning the scope of protection for workers.

Facts

Judgment

See also

United Kingdom labour law
Aslam v Uber BV (2016) Case no: 2202550/2015

Notes

References
E McGaughey, A Casebook on Labour Law (Hart 2018) ch 3

United Kingdom labour case law